The Florida Gators women's soccer team represents the University of Florida in the sport of college soccer.  The Gators compete in Division I of the National Collegiate Athletics Association (NCAA) and the Southeastern Conference (SEC).  They are coached by Samantha Bohon and play their home games in James G. Pressly Stadium on the university's Gainesville, Florida campus.  They have won thirteen conference championships and one NCAA national championship.

History 

Becky Burleigh was named the first head coach of the start-up Florida Gators soccer program on June 28, 1994, and has served as the only head coach in the program's history.  Since the Gators' began play in the fall of 1995, the team has compiled a record of 414-120-36 and a winning percentage of 0.7579, and Burleigh's Gators teams have qualified for the NCAA Tournament in 21 of the 24 seasons of the program's history.

In 1998, in the Gators soccer program's fourth year of existence, the Gators won their first NCAA national title by defeating the defending national champion North Carolina Tar Heels 1–0 in the final game of the tournament.  The 1998 Gators finished 26–1, having lost their only match to the same North Carolina team that the Gators defeated in the NCAA championship final.  Players from the Gators' 1998 national championship team included All-Americans Erin Baxter, Danielle Fotopoulos and Heather Mitts.

In addition to their 1998 national championship season, the Gators have advanced to the NCAA tournament semi-final once (2001), the quarter-finals four times (1996, 2003, 2014, 2017), and the round of sixteen six times (2006, 2007, 2008, 2012, 2014, 2017).

The Gators play in the Southeastern Conference.  In conference play, the Gators teams have won ten SEC championships, and twelve SEC tournament titles, leading all other SEC teams since the Florida soccer team began play in 1995.  Most recently, the Gators won the SEC championship (regular season) again in 2015 and the SEC championship (tournament) in 2016. In 2016, the Gators advanced to the third round of the NCAA tournament before losing to Auburn.  The Gators finished the 2016 season 8–3-0 in the SEC, and 17-5-1 overall.

Current roster
As of April 20, 2021

Notable players

First-team All-Americans
The following Florida soccer players have been named first-team All-Americans:
Erin Baxter (1997)
Danielle Fotopoulos (1998)
Heather Mitts (1999)
Abby Wambach (1999, 2001)
Melanie Booth (2005)
Erika Tymrak (2012)
Christen Westphal (2015)
Savannah Jordan (2015)

Internationals and professionals
 Former All-American Danielle Fotopoulos was a member of the U.S. National Team (1996–2005), and played on the 1999 FIFA Women's World Cup championship team.
 Abby Wambach and Heather Mitts won the gold medal with the United States in women's soccer at the 2004 Summer Olympics in Athens, and Mitts won the gold medal again at the 2008 games in Beijing.  Both Wambach and Mitts were members of the U.S. runner-up team in the 2011 FIFA Women's World Cup, while Wambach captained the 2015 FIFA Women's World Cup winning team.
 Former All-American Melanie Booth has been a member of the Canada National Team since 2001, and was a member of Canada's FIFA Women's World Cup team in (2007).
 Danielle Murphy played for the England National Team from 1998 to 2003, and was the youngest-ever member of England's FIFA Women's World Cup team.
 Erika Tymrak was named National Women's Soccer League Rookie of the Year in 2013 and won two titles with FC Kansas City, in 2014 and 2014.
 Deanne Rose has been a member of the Canada National team since 2015, and won a bronze medal at the 2016 Olympic Games as well as a gold at the 2020 Tokyo Olympics.
 Christen Westphal was the third overall selection in the 2016 NWSL College Draft, taken by the Boston Breakers in the first round. She joined fellow former Gators Tymrak, Adriana Leon, Lauren Silver, Havana Solaun and Kat Williamson in the league.
 Kaylan Marckese was selected with the 28th pick in the 2019 NWSL College Draft by Sky Blue FC (now known as Gotham FC). In July 2022, she signed for Arsenal of the WSL.

Coaching staff 

Becky Burleigh became the first head coach of the Florida Gators soccer program on June 28, 1994.  Prior to coaching at Florida, Burleigh was the head coach at Berry College, where her Lady Fury teams won two NAIA national championships.  At Florida and Berry, Burleigh compiled an overall record of 496-141-43, with a winning percentage of 0.7610.   She ranked fourth in total number of wins, and fifth in winning percentage, among all active Division I women's soccer coaches.

Tony Amato served as the coach for the 2021–2022 season before being terminated after 1 season and a 4-12-4 record.

Samantha Bohon was hired as the third coach of the program on May 16, 2022.

James G. Pressly Stadium 

The Florida Gators soccer team plays its home games in James G. Pressly Stadium.  Pressly Stadium is a dual-purpose facility serving as home to the soccer team and the men's and women's outdoor track & field teams.  It is a lighted stadium and has a seating capacity of approximately 4,500.  The stadium is named for James G. Pressly, a 1972 alumnus of the University of Florida College of Law, who made a generous contribution to have the facility upgraded for Division I play.

The Gators soccer team also has the exclusive use of a soccer practice field that was completed as part of the Florida Lacrosse Facility in 2009.

Season records

See also 

 List of University of Florida Athletic Hall of Fame members
 List of University of Florida Olympians
 SEC Women's Soccer Tournament
 University Athletic Association
 Women's Soccer

References

External links 
 

 
1994 establishments in Florida
Association football clubs established in 1994
NCAA Division I women's soccer teams